"Mata Hari" is a song sung by Azerbaijani singer Efendi. The song represented Azerbaijan in the Eurovision Song Contest 2021 in Rotterdam, the Netherlands.

Eurovision Song Contest

Internal selection 
On 20 March 2020, Azerbaijani state broadcaster İTV confirmed that Efendi would represent Azerbaijan in the 2021 contest. A teaser for "Mata Hari" was released on 11 March 2021 on the official Eurovision YouTube channel.

At Eurovision 
The 65th edition of the Eurovision Song Contest took place in Rotterdam, the Netherlands and consisted of two semi-finals on 18 May and 20 May 2021, and the grand final on 22 May 2021. On 17 November 2020, it was announced that Azerbaijan would be performing in the second half of the first semi-final of the contest.

Charts

See also 
 Mata Hari (Anne-Karine Strøm song)

References 

2021 songs
2021 singles
Pop-folk songs
Eurovision songs of 2021
Eurovision songs of Azerbaijan
Samira Efendi songs
Songs about Mata Hari